Áfram Latibær! (English: Go LazyTown!) is an Icelandic children's stage play by Magnús Scheving, based on his Icelandic book of the same name. The play premiered in 1997 in Loftkastalinn and was very popular. Baltasar Kormákur was the director, and the cast included Magnús Scheving, Selma Björnsdóttir, Steinn Ármann Magnússon, Ingrid Jónsdóttir, Jón Stefán Kristjánsson, Ólafur Guðmundsson, Magnús Ólafsson, Sigurveig Jónsdóttir, Sigurjón Kjartansson, Ari Matthíasson, Pálína Jónsdóttir, Þórhallur Ágústsson and Guðmundur Andrés Erlingsson. It was later adapted into the hit TV series LazyTown.

Plot 
The play is about the residents of LazyTown who are always lazy and lead unhealthy lifestyles. The mayor receives a letter from the President telling about a sports competition in LazyTown that the residents have to compete in. After the mayor is unsuccessful at convincing the residents to compete in the competition, Sportacus arrives, and he teaches the residents how to live a healthy lifestyle and convinces them to compete. LazyTown eventually ends up winning the competition.

Cast

Songs 

 "Lífið er fúlt í Latabæ" - Mayor
 "Líttu á þetta Latibær" - Mayor
 "Stína símalína" - Bessie and the Mayor
 "Öllu er lokið Latibær" - Mayor
 "Íþróttaálfurinn" - Sportacus
 "Siggi sæti" - Ziggy
 "Goggi mega" - Pixel

 "Maggi mjói" - Jives and his mother
 "Eyrún eyðslukló" - Penny
 "Solla stirða" - Stephanie
 "Halla hrekkjusvín" - Trixie
 "Nenni níski" - Stingy
 "Löggulagið" - Officer Obtuse
 "Áfram Latibær!" - Everyone

References

External links
 

1996 musicals
Icelandic musicals
LazyTown